Ivan Mikhailovich Musatov (born 14 February 1976, in Estonia) is a member of the State Duma for the Liberal Democratic Party of Russia.

He is a member of the Committee on National Security of the State Duma. He attended a juridical academy from 2000 to 2003. His father, Mikhail Musatov, was also a member of the State Duma.

On 24 March 2022, the United States Treasury sanctioned him in response to the 2022 Russian invasion of Ukraine.

Personal life
Ivan Musatov is married to Julia Lakschin, who had previously been married to Christian Louis de Massy, first cousin of Albert II, Prince of Monaco. The couple have one child, Serafima Lakschin (born 2004).

References

1976 births
Living people
Fourth convocation members of the State Duma (Russian Federation)
Liberal Democratic Party of Russia politicians
Financial University under the Government of the Russian Federation alumni
Eighth convocation members of the State Duma (Russian Federation)
Russian individuals subject to the U.S. Department of the Treasury sanctions